WMPW is a Classic Country formatted broadcast radio station licensed to Danville, Virginia in the United States, serving Danville and Southern Pittsylvania County in Virginia and Northern Caswell County in North Carolina.  WMPW is owned and operated by Lakes Media, LLC.

Format change
On September 1, 2016, the Classic Country format was dropped in favor of Adult Contemporary and the station's FM translator frequency switched from 103.7 FM to 105.9 FM.  The Classic Country format was intended to continue as an online-only station.  A year after the station switched to its Adult Contemporary format as "105.9 More FM", it flipped back to Classic Country and brought back the "Country Legends" branding as well.

Translator
In addition to the main station, WMPW is relayed by an FM translator to widen its broadcast area.

References

External links
Country Legends 105.9 Online

1959 establishments in Virginia
Classic country radio stations in the United States
Radio stations established in 1959
MPW